The Groningen Protocol is a medical protocol created in September 2004 by Eduard Verhagen, the medical director of the department of pediatrics at the University Medical Center Groningen (UMCG) in Groningen, the Netherlands. It contains directives with criteria under which physicians can perform "active ending of life on infants" (child euthanasia) without fear of legal prosecution.

Origin
The protocol was created by a committee of physicians and others at the University Medical Center Groningen, in consultation with the Groningen district attorney, and has been ratified by the Dutch National Association of Pediatricians.

According to its authors, the Groningen Protocol was developed in order to assist with the decision making process when considering actively ending the life of a newborn, by providing the information required to assess the situation within a legal and medical framework. In July 2005 the Protocol was declared to be mandatory by the Dutch Society for Pediatrics.

Protocol
The protocol, drawn up after extensive consultation between physicians, lawyers, parents and the Prosecution Office, offers procedures and guidelines to achieve the correct decision and performance. The final decision about "active ending of life on infants" is not in the hands of the physicians but with the parents, with physicians and social workers agreeing to it. Criteria are, amongst others, "unbearable suffering" and "expected quality of life". Only the parents may initiate the procedure. The procedure is reported to be working well.

For the Dutch public prosecutor, the termination of a child's life (under age 1) is acceptable if four requirements were properly fulfilled:

The presence of hopeless and unbearable suffering.
The consent of the parents to termination of life.
Medical consultation having taken place.
Careful execution of the termination.

Doctors who end the life of a baby must report the death to the local medical examiner, who in turn reports it to both the district attorney and to a review committee. The procedure differs in this respect from the black letter law governing voluntary euthanasia. There, the medical examiner sends the report only to the regional review committee, which alerts the district attorney only if it judges that the physician acted improperly.

Legal status
The Dutch euthanasia laws require people to ask for euthanasia themselves (voluntary euthanasia), and it is legal for people of 12 years and older. In the Netherlands, euthanasia remains technically illegal for patients under the age of 12. The Groningen Protocol does not give physicians unassailable legal protection. Case law has so far protected physicians from prosecution as long as they act in accordance with the protocol, but no black-letter law exists in this area.

Review
In 2005 a review study was undertaken of all 22 reported cases between 1997 and 2004. All cases concerned newborns with spina bifida and hydrocephalus. In all cases, at least 2 doctors were consulted outside the medical team. In 17 of 22 cases, a multidisciplinary spina bifida team was consulted. All parents consented to the termination of life; in 4 cases they explicitly requested it. The mean time between reporting of the case and the decision concerning prosecution was 5.3 months. None of the cases led to prosecution. The study concluded that all cases of active termination of life reported were found to be in accordance with good practice.

Reception
The protocol is controversial and has been attacked by anti-euthanasia campaigner Wesley J. Smith, Senior Fellow at the Discovery Institute, who described it as little more than an attempt to legalize infanticide. 

Several studies have questioned the basis for the protocol and have recommended abandoning it;  however, bioethicist Jacob M. Appel of New York University has said that the protocol is a success and should be expanded. Hilde Lindemann and Marian Verkerk said that the policy must be evaluated in the context of Dutch culture and medicine, but Eric Kodish has harshly criticized the protocol and its premises in an article published in The Lancet. Kodish concluded by inviting resistance to the protocol by means of civil disobedience against the medical institutionalization of infanticide.

See also
Futile medical care

References
Notes

Further reading

Groningen (city)
Euthanasia in the Netherlands
Netherlands